Tetrapyrgia ('four towers') was a town of the Roman province of Pamphylia (clustered around a central part of Turkey's southern Mediterranean coast). It was near the coast and inhabited in Roman times.

Its site is east of contemporary settlement Limnae. It was useful for trading goods from Asiatic Turkey (Anatolia).

References

Populated places in ancient Pamphylia
Former populated places in Turkey
Roman towns and cities in Turkey
History of Antalya Province